Alex Ongaro (born 5 October 1963) is a Canadian former cyclist. He competed in the sprint event at the 1984 Summer Olympics.

References

External links
 

1963 births
Living people
Canadian male cyclists
Olympic cyclists of Canada
Cyclists from Alberta
Cyclists at the 1984 Summer Olympics
Sportspeople from Edmonton
Commonwealth Games medallists in cycling
Commonwealth Games silver medallists for Canada
Cyclists at the 1986 Commonwealth Games
20th-century Canadian people
21st-century Canadian people
Medallists at the 1986 Commonwealth Games